Kathryn Miller Haines is an American novelist and actor, known for her Rosie Winter series of mystery novels. Haines moved to Pittsburgh in 1994, where she attended the University of Pittsburgh for her Master's degree. She has served as the associate director of the Center for American Music at the University of Pittsburgh and, in 2012, was nominated for an Edgar Award for her book The Girl Is Murder.

Bibliography

Rosie Winter
The War Against Miss Winter (2007)
The Winter of Her Discontent (2008)
Winter in June (2009)
When Winter Returns (2010)

The Girl is Murder
The Girl is Murder (2011)
The Girl is Trouble (2012)

Stand Alone
The Girl from Yesterday (2017)

Plays
Sibling Rivalry (2013)

References

External links
 

American mystery novelists
Writers from Pittsburgh
American women novelists
Women mystery writers
Year of birth missing (living people)
Living people
21st-century American novelists
21st-century American women writers
University of Pittsburgh alumni
University of Pittsburgh staff
Novelists from Pennsylvania